Lowthwaite Fell is a hill in the Northern Fells of the Lake District in England.

See also

List of hills in the Lake District

Fells of the Lake District
Allerdale